The American Soccer League, established in 1921, was the first of four different professional soccer sports leagues in the United States to use the ASL name. It was formed by the merger of teams from the National Association Football League and the Southern New England Soccer League. For several years the ASL's popularity rivaled the popularity of the National Football League. Disputes with the United States Football Association and FIFA, as well as the onset of the Great Depression, led to the league's collapse in spring 1933.

History
The original American Soccer League, operating between 1921 and 1933, was the first significant, viable, professional soccer league in the United States. The league operated primarily in the Northeastern United States, mainly in the New York metropolitan area, Massachusetts, Rhode Island, and Pennsylvania.  The ASL was created by the merger of several teams from the National Association Football League (NAFBL) and Southern New England Soccer League in 1921.  The move came from a growing disenchantment with the mismanagement of the NAFBL as well as the desire by the United States Football Association (USFA) to create a unified first division league. The ASL's first secretary was Thomas Cahill, who had founded the United States Football Association and who had been the first head coach of the U.S. national team.

By 1924, the combination of excellent pay and a high level of play drew talented overseas players, especially from Scotland and England, with 50 European internationals good enough to play for their national teams playing in the ASL. This led to a significant amount of resentment in Europe and threats of sanctions from FIFA, including the possible expulsion of the USFA. At the Sixteenth Annual Congress of FIFA on June 4, 1927, the USFA and the other national associations came to an agreement regarding player transfers which defused the situation. The ASL then ran afoul of the USFA when team owners complained that USFA's requirement that ASL teams play in the National Challenge Cup created an unnecessary financial burden. At the time the Challenge Cup ran during the ASL season forcing the ASL teams to travel long distances by train or bus to play cup games, then return to the Northeast to play league games. Therefore, the ASL boycotted the 1924 National Challenge Cup. They reentered the competition the next year after the USFA reduced its take of the gate receipts from 33.3% to 15%.

Soccer Wars
However, resentment continued to simmer between the league and governing body.  Matters came to a head in 1928, when the ASL decided to again boycott the Challenge Cup. When three ASL clubs, most prominently Bethlehem Steel, defied the league and entered the cup anyway, the ASL suspended them.  In response, the USFA and FIFA declared the ASL an "outlaw league". This sparked the "Soccer War". The ASL team owners defied USFA and FIFA, relying on the league's reputation to continue to draw players. At first it seemed as if the ASL might win; however, USFA then helped bankroll the creation of a new league, the Eastern Professional Soccer League (ESL), to rival the ASL. The three ex-ASL teams joined with several teams from the Southern New York Soccer Association (SNYSA) to form the ESL. This led to the SNYSA, under the leadership of Nat Agar, owner of the ASL Brooklyn Wanderers, to leave USFA and ally with the ASL.  Despite the alliance between the ASL and SNYSA, the creation of a competing league caused severe financial strains on the ASL.  The league finally broke and came into compliance with USFA and FIFA. In the fall of the 1929/30 season, the ESL and ASL merged to form the Atlantic Coast League which began a 1930 spring-fall season.  After the summer break, the league was renamed the American Soccer League and the league finished the fall half of the 1930 season with a different name than it began the spring half.

However, the Soccer Wars had permanently crippled the ASL and it collapsed at the end of the 1933 spring season. Ironically, while USFA and FIFA "won" the wars and established their pre-eminence over the ASL, the spectacle of a U.S. athletic association conspiring with a European organization to undermine a U.S. athletic league alienated many U.S. sports fans by creating an image of soccer as a sport controlled by foreigners.  These fans turned their backs on soccer, relegating the sport to the position of a minor league, ethnic-based sport for decades to come.

Champions

Complete team list
Legend
 – existed before joining ASL.  – continued after ASL.  – existed before ASL and after ASL.

References

External links
 Logos as they appeared on goalie caps
 Historical overview of the Soccer Wars
 Year by year standings

 
Defunct soccer leagues in the United States
Sports leagues established in 1921
Sports leagues disestablished in 1933
1921 establishments in the United States
1933 disestablishments in the United States